Neillia is a genus of the botanical family Rosaceae. They are deciduous shrubs or subshrubs. They produce clusters of terminal or axillary flowers, and have dry dehiscent fruits. They are found exclusively in eastern and central Asia.

This genus is named for Patrick Neill.

Species

This genus contains around fifteen to seventeen species. Recent phylogenetic analysis has shown that the genus Stephanandra is embedded in Neillia, and is perhaps the evolutionary result of hybridization within Neillia lineages. Because of this, the former members of Stephanandra are included in this classification.

The species of Neillia are:
Neillia affinis
Neillia breviracemosa
Neillia densiflora
Neillia fugongensis
Neillia gracilis
Neillia grandiflora
Neillia incisa – lace shrub
Neillia jianggangshanensis
Neillia ribesioides
Neillia rubiflora
Neillia serratisepala
Neillia sinensis
Neillia sparsiflora
Neillia tanakae
Neillia thibetica
Neillia thrysiflora
Neillia uekii

References

Neillieae
Rosaceae genera